Dino Liviero (30 May 1938 – 6 May 1970) was an Italian road racing cyclist. Born in Castelfranco Veneto, he won a Giro di Campania (1960) and a stage in Roma–Napoli–Roma (1960), plus a stage in the 1962 Giro d'Italia.

External links

1938 births
1970 deaths
People from Castelfranco Veneto
Italian male cyclists
Cyclists from the Province of Treviso